Bertha Hope-Booker ( Rosemond; born November 8, 1936, Los Angeles, California) is an American jazz pianist and jazz educator. She is the widow of fellow pianist Elmo Hope, with whom she collaborated. She has toured Europe and Japan and played with a diverse group of artists. In the 1990s, she had her first CDs as a leader and additionally worked with her second husband, bassist Walter Booker.

Biography 
Hope-Booker was born in Los Angeles in 1936. Both of her parents worked in the entertainment industry. Her mother, Corinne Meaux Rosemond, worked as a chorus line dancer and her father, Clinton Rosemond, was a stage manager and singer who had worked with Mabel Mercer and Eubie Blake. She began studying classical piano with her parents at the age of three. Her interested in jazz came from listening to Shelly Manne, Shorty Rogers and, most importantly, Bud Powell. Seeing Powell play at the Haig in the early 1950s influenced Hope-Booker's decision to play jazz herself. Hope-Booker attended Los Angeles City College where she befriended Eric Dolphy. Dolphy introduced her to Max Roach and Clifford Brown. Hope-Booker was encouraged to play by musicians such as Les McCann, Teddy Edwards and Vi Redd. For six months, Hope-Booker studied piano under Richie Powell.

Hope-Booker started playing professionally in Johnny Otis's band as well as local trios. In 1958, Hope-Booker met Elmo Hope who was touring with Sonny Rollins. Hope-Booker married Elmo in 1960 and the following year they moved to New York City. Together they recorded an album, Hope-Full, for Riverside which featured Hope-Booker on three songs. After Elmo's death in 1967, Hope-Booker gave up her music career despite being offered a place in Art Blakey's band.

Discography
An asterisk (*) indicates that the year is that of release.

As leader

As sidewoman

References

External links
 Hope's biography on the History Makers Project

1936 births
American jazz pianists
Living people
Musicians from Los Angeles
20th-century American pianists
Jazz musicians from California
20th-century American women pianists
21st-century American pianists
21st-century American women pianists